Rochus van Veen (1630–1693) was a Dutch Golden Age painter.

Biography

According to Houbraken, he followed in the artistic footsteps of his father Otto van Veen, who may have been his uncle. Rochus had two sons who also became painters. All three lived in Beverwijk and all specialized in painting watercolors of plants, birds and insects on paper and parchment. In 1706 their drawings, prints, and paintings were auctioned in Haarlem.

According to the RKD he was also known as Rocho. The RKD does not mention a relation to Otto van Veen, who painted historical allegories. Rochus painted watercolors for horticulturalists. He painted for Agnes Block's garden and one of his paintings resembles the one she holds in her hand in a family portrait by Jan Weenix.

References

1630 births
1693 deaths
Dutch Golden Age painters
Dutch male painters
People from Beverwijk